National Highway 6 or National Road No.6 (10006) is one of the national highways of Cambodia. It terminates merging into the National Highway 5.

National Highway 6A
From Phnom Penh to the town of Skuon, where it connects with National Highway 7, the highway has been upgraded to dual carriageway and it bears the name of National Highway 6A.

References

Roads in Cambodia